Stories from the Golf is an Australian television comedy series first broadcast on SBS in 2004. The series was made up of 13 five-minute episodes. Stories from the Golf was written and produced by Wayne Hope and Robyn Butler.

Cast
 Wayne Hope as Anton
 Robyn Butler as Candice
 Irene Korsten as Sandi
 Bob Franklin as Kyle
 Marco Chiappi as Cop
 Roz Hammond
 Monica Maughan

See also
 The Librarians
 Very Small Business

References

External links 
 

Australian comedy television series
2004 Australian television series debuts
Special Broadcasting Service original programming